José Balaca y Carrión (1800–1869) was a Spanish painter born in Cartagena. He was father of the painters Eduardo Balaca and Ricardo Balaca.
 
In 1828, he went to Madrid to attend the Real Academia de Bellas Artes de San Fernando. He later obtained royal patronage, for patriotic scenes from the First Carlist War. Following the overthrow of the Espartero regime, he went into exile and established himself in Lisbon as a portrait painter and producer of miniatures, receiving commissions from the royal court.

He travelled extensively, making lengthy stays in London and  Paris, where he resided and worked for some time. Balaca finally returned to Spain and settled permanently in Madrid in 1852. He died there at the age of sixty-nine on November 19, 1869.

References

D. Foskett, A Dictionary of British Miniature Painters, Vol I, London (1972)

19th-century Spanish painters
19th-century Spanish male artists
Spanish male painters
People from Cartagena, Spain
Portrait miniaturists
1800 births
1869 deaths